Aşık is Turkish for Ashik, a traditional musician and troubadour

Aşık is a Turkish name. Notable people with the name include:

Given name
 Aşık Çelebi (1520–1572), Ottoman biographer, poet, and translator
 Âşık İbretî (1920–1976), Turkish ashik, poet and folk singer
 Aşık Khanlar (1950–1998), Azerbaijani ashik
 Âşık Ali İzzet Özkan (1902–1981), Turkish minstrel
 Aşık Mahzuni Şerif (1939—2002), Turkish folk musician
 Âşık Veysel Şatıroğlu (1894–1973), Turkish minstrel and poet
 Aşik Sümmani (1861–1915), Turkish ashik

Surname
 Ašik-paša Zade (1400–1484), Ottoman historian
 Emre Aşık (born 1973), Turkish footballer
 Eyüp Aşık (born 1953), Turkish politician
 Ömer Aşık (born 1986), Turkish basketball player
 Ömer Aşık (archer) (born 1991), Turkish Paralympian archer

See also
 Asik (disambiguation)

Turkish-language surnames
Turkish masculine given names